Willow Creek is a tributary of the Colorado River, approximately  long, in north central Colorado in the United States.

It rises in northwestern Grand County, in the Arapaho National Forest south of Willow Creek Pass at the continental divide. It flows southeast through Willow Creek Reservoir and joins the Colorado three miles northeast of Granby.

See also
 List of rivers of Colorado
 List of tributaries of the Colorado River

References

Rivers of Colorado
Rivers of Grand County, Colorado
Tributaries of the Colorado River in Colorado